Mormogystia proleuca is a moth in the family Cossidae. It is found in the southern part of the Arabian peninsula, including southern Saudi Arabia (the Asir Mountains), southern Oman (Dhofar) and Yemen.

The wingspan is 25–29 mm. The ground colour of the forewings is brown. The head, thorax and abdomen are light yellow.

The larvae feed on Acacia species.

References

Moths described in 1896
Cossinae
Invertebrates of the Arabian Peninsula